Ayọ̀ Bámgbóṣé (born January 27, 1932) is an academic linguist, the first professor of Linguistics in Nigeria. He has made contributions to education and linguistics, achieving recognition in form of honours and election to offices in professional bodies.

Early life and education 
Bamgbose was born in Odopotu, near Ijebu Ode in Ogun State of Nigeria in 1932. His father, Rev. Sangodipe Bamgbose, was a community leader of Odopotu, who was born into a prominent family of Egungun worshippers. His last name Bamgbose, which means help me carry Shango's wand, (ose), and his father's first name, meaning Sango consoles, also suggests that his family also worshipped Sango, the god of thunder. After primary education Bamgbose was admitted, in 1948, into St. Andrew's College. He qualified as a grade two teacher in 1951. He then gained admission into University of Ibadan, affiliated with the University of London. He graduated with a high second class upper division B.A. (Hons) English degree of the University of London in the year 1960. He proceeded to the University of Edinburgh where he earned a diploma in general linguistics in 1961 and his PhD in 1963 with the thesis A Study of Structures and Classes in the Grammar of Modern Yoruba.

He joined the staff of the University of Ibadan in 1963 as a Lecturer, rising quickly to the grade of Senior Lecturer in 1966 and to Professor in 1968. On retirement from the University, he was honoured with the title of Professor Emeritus.

The core of Bamgbose's contribution to knowledge is his work on the structure of Yoruba language. Among his twenty-one books, Grammar of Yoruba (Cambridge University Press, 1966) remains a classic in the application of modern linguistics to Yoruba. Equally significant is Fonologi ati Girama Yoruba (University Press Ltd., Ibadan, 1990) which tackles the problem of linguistic metalanguage of Yoruba students. His versatility is evident in Orthographies of Nigerian Languages [Efik, Hausa, Igbo, Yoruba] (National Language Centre, Lagos, 1981), Language and the Nation (Edinburgh Univ. Press, 1991), and Language and Exclusion (LIT Verlag, 2000). Bamgbose also wrote over 130 papers or chapters in books.

Honours and Accomplishments 
In 1984, Professor Bamgbose became the first African linguist to be conferred honorary membership of the Linguistic Society of America (LSA). In 2000, he was elected as the first African president of the International Association of World Englishes. In 2003, he was elected the 2nd Vice-President of the Permanent International Committee of Linguists, the first time an African linguist has been so honoured. In 2009, he was elected Foundation President of the Assembly of Academicians of the African Academy of Languages (ACALAN). He is also a member of the executive committee of the Nigerian Academy of Letters of which he is the foundation member. He was the sole recipient of the Nigerian National Order of Merit in 1990.

Notable Visiting Appointments 
 Visiting Professor to University of Hamburg in 1979-80
 Visiting Fellow to Clare Hall, Cambridge University in 1987-88
 George A. Miller Visiting Professor to the University of Illinois, Urbana-Champaign in 1993-95
 Visiting Professor to the University of Leipzig in 1997-1999.

References

1932 births
Living people
Linguists from Nigeria
Linguists of Yoruba
Alumni of the University of Edinburgh
Academic staff of the University of Ibadan
Alumni of the University of London